Max Krochmal is an American historian. He is an associate professor of history at Texas Christian University. He won the Organization of American Historians's Frederick Jackson Turner Award in 2017 for Blue Texas: The Making of a Multiracial Democratic Coalition in the Civil Rights Era.

References

External links
Max Krochmal on C-SPAN

Living people
University of California, Santa Cruz alumni
Duke University alumni
Texas Christian University faculty
21st-century American historians
21st-century American male writers
Year of birth missing (living people)
American male non-fiction writers